Datu Abdullah Sangki, officially the Municipality of Datu Abdullah Sangki (Maguindanaon: Ingud nu Datu Abdullah Sangki; Iranun: Inged a Datu Abdullah Sangki), is a  municipality in the province of Maguindanao del Sur, Philippines. According to the 2020 census, it has a population of 30,117 people.

The municipality was created under Muslim Mindanao Autonomy Act No. 153, passed by the Regional Legislative Assembly on August 15, 2003, and approved on August 20, 2003, ratified in the plebiscite held on January 3, 2004. It was carved out from its mother town, Ampatuan. The MMA law creating the municipality provides that its administrative center shall be established in barangay Talisawa.

Geography

Barangays
Datu Abdullah Sangki is politically subdivided into 10 barangays.
Banaba
Dimampao
Guinibon
Kaya-kaya
Mao
Maranding
Old Maganoy
Sugadol
Talisawa
Tukanalugong

Climate

Demographics

Economy

References

External links
Datu Abdullah Sangki Profile at the DTI Cities and Municipalities Competitive Index
MMA Act No. 153 : An Act Creating the Municipality of Datu Abdullah Sangki in the Province of Maguindanao
[ Philippine Standard Geographic Code]
Philippine Census Information
Local Governance Performance Management System

Municipalities of Maguindanao del Sur